Elmira Gambarova (born 14 March 1994) is an Azerbaijani freestyle wrestler. She won the silver medal in the women's 62 kg event at the 2019 European Games held in Minsk, Belarus. In the same year, she also won one of the bronze medals in the 59 kg event at the 2019 European Wrestling Championships held in Bucharest, Romania.

In 2017, she competed in the women's freestyle 63 kg event at the European Wrestling Championships held in Novi Sad, Serbia. She was eliminated in her second match by Inna Trazhukova of Russia.

Achievements

References

External links 
 

Living people
1994 births
Place of birth missing (living people)
Azerbaijani female sport wrestlers
Wrestlers at the 2015 European Games
Wrestlers at the 2019 European Games
European Games silver medalists for Azerbaijan
European Games medalists in wrestling
European Wrestling Championships medalists
Islamic Solidarity Games medalists in wrestling
Islamic Solidarity Games competitors for Azerbaijan
21st-century Azerbaijani women